Aenictopecheidae is a rare family of insects occurring worldwide but containing only a few species, including a single American species, Boreostolus americanus.  This species lives under large, flat stones and sandy substrates along mountain streams in Oregon, Washington, and Colorado.  It is 5 mm long and occurs in both the macropterous and brachypterous condition.  It is assumed to be predaceous.

Genera 
Aenictocoris 
Aenictopechys 
Australostolus 
Boreostolus 
†Cretocephalus  (Cenomanian, Burmese Amber, Myanmar)
Gamostolus 
Lomagostus 
Maoristolus 
Murphyanella 
Nymphocoris 
Timahocoris 
Tornocrusus

Notes

Enicocephalomorpha
Heteroptera families